Chan Hao-ching and Latisha Chan were the defending champions, but Latisha could not participate due to a medical condition. Hao-ching played alongside Yang Zhaoxuan, but they lost in the first round to Nadiia Kichenok and Anastasia Rodionova.

Samantha Stosur and Zhang Shuai won the title, defeating Shuko Aoyama and Lidziya Marozava in the final, 6–4, 6–4.

Seeds

Draw

Draw

References
Main Draw

Hong Kong Tennis Open - Doubles
Hong Kong Open (tennis)